The 2021 Kyiv Open was a professional tennis tournament played on clay courts. It was the first edition of the tournament which was part of the 2021 ATP Challenger Tour. It took place in Kyiv, Ukraine between 6 and 12 September 2021.

Singles main-draw entrants

Seeds

 1 Rankings are as of 30 August 2021.

Other entrants
The following players received wildcards into the singles main draw:
  Illya Beloborodko
  Oleksii Krutykh
  Richard Zusman

The following player received entry into the singles main draw using a protected ranking:
  Joris De Loore

The following players received entry into the singles main draw as alternates:
  Alessandro Bega
  Ergi Kırkın

The following players received entry from the qualifying draw:
  Ivan Gakhov
  Georgii Kravchenko
  Alex Rybakov
  Clément Tabur

Champions

Singles

  Franco Agamenone def.  Sebastián Báez 7–5, 6–2.

Doubles

  Orlando Luz /  Aleksandr Nedovyesov def.  Denys Molchanov /  Sergiy Stakhovsky 6–4, 6–4.

References

2021
2021 ATP Challenger Tour
2021 in Ukrainian sport
September 2021 sports events in Ukraine